George White's Scandals were a long-running string of Broadway revues produced by George White that ran from 1919–1939, modeled after the Ziegfeld Follies. The "Scandals" launched the careers of many entertainers, including W. C. Fields, the Three Stooges, Ray Bolger, Helen Morgan, Ethel Merman, Ann Miller, Eleanor Powell, Bert Lahr and Rudy Vallée. Louise Brooks, Dolores Costello,  Barbara Pepper, and Alice Faye got their show business start as lavishly dressed (or underdressed) chorus girls strutting to the "Scandal Walk". Much of George Gershwin's early work appeared in the 1920–24 editions of Scandals. The Black Bottom, danced by Ziegfeld Follies star Ann Pennington and Tom Patricola, touched off a national dance craze.

George White's Scandals is also the name of several movies set within the Scandals, all of which focus primarily on the show's acts, with a thin backstage plot stringing them all together. The best known of these was 1934's George White's Scandals written by Jack Yellen, which marked the film debut of Alice Faye. Flapper-era cartoonist and designer Russell Patterson worked on Broadway in various capacities; for George White's Scandals of 1936, he served as scenic designer. George White's Scandals of 1920 was featured in an episode of the television series The Young Indiana Jones Chronicles.

George White

White was an American theatrical producer and director who also was an actor, choreographer, composer, dancer, dramatist, lyricist and screenwriter, as well as a Broadway theater-owner. Appearing in the Ziegfeld Follies of 1915, he popularized the Turkey Trot dance.

The Scandals casts

1919

Lester Allen
La Sylphe
Peggy Dolan
Ann Pennington
Ona Munson
Yvette Rugel
The George White Girls, including Christine Welford

1920
Lester Allen
Peggy Dolan
Lou Holtz
La Sylphe
Ann Pennington
The George White Girls, including Christine Welford

1921
Lester Allen
Lou Holtz
Tess Gardella
Charles King
Ann Pennington
The George White Girls, including Christine Welford

1922
Lester Allen
Peggy Dolan
W. C. Fields
Winnie Lightner
Sally Long
Paul Whiteman & His Orchestra
The George White Girls (including Dolores Costello)

1923
Lester Allen
Winnie Lightner
The Breens
Johnny Dooley
Tom Patricola
Tip Top Four
The George White Girls (including Dolores Costello, Helene Costello and Edna May Reed)

1924
Lester Allen
Tony DeMarco
Peggy Dolan
Winnie Lightner
Tom Patricola
 The Williams Sisters
The George White Girls (including Louise Brooks, Dolores Costello, Helene Costello, Dorothy Sebastian and Sally Starr)

1925
Helen Morgan
Gordon Dooley
Elm City Four
The McCarthy Sisters
Tom Patricola
The George White Girls (including Louise Brooks)
Patricia Bowman

1926
The Fairbanks Twins
Portland Hoffa
Willie and Eugene Howard
Tom Patricola
Ann Pennington
Harry Richman
Fowler & Tamara
Frances Williams
The George White Girls
Patricia Bowman

1928
Tom Patricola
Eugene and Willie Howard
Ann Pennington 
Harry Richman
The Russell Markert Dancers
June MacCloy
Frances Williams
The George White Girls (including Boots Mallory)

1929
Jack Durant
Elm City Four
Ted and Sally
Willie and Eugene Howard
Frances Williams
Marietta Canty
The George White Girls

1931
Ray Bolger
Ethel Barrymore Colt
Eugene and Willie Howard, including "Pay the Two Dollars"
Everett Marshall, including the first performance of "That's Why Darkies Were Born"
Ethel Merman, introducing “Life Is Just a Bowl of Cherries”
Rudy Vallée
Alice Faye
Beth White
The George White Girls

1932 (Music Hall Varieties)
Lili Damita
Bert Lahr
Harry Richman
Eleanor Powell
The Dancing Beauties (including Barbara Pepper)

1934 (film)
Rudy Vallée
Jimmy Durante
Ketti Gallian
Alice Faye
Cliff Edwards
Dixie Dunbar
Gertrude Michael

1935 (film)
Alice Faye
James Dunn
Cliff Edwards
Eleanor Powell
Lyda Roberti
Ned Sparks
Dixie Dunbar

1936
Cliff Edwards
Bert Lahr
Rudy Vallée
Willie and Eugene Howard
The George White Girls

1939
Ben Blue
Ella Logan
The Kim Loo Sisters
Ann Miller
Harry Stockwell
The Three Stooges
The George White Girls (including Marie McDonald)

References

External links

Broadway musicals
Revues